Matias Defensor (born September 23, 1943) is a Filipino politician. A member of Lakas CMD, he represented the 3rd District of Quezon City in the House of Representatives of the Philippines for two terms from 2004 to 2010. He failed to win a third term as 2010 Elections, losing to Jorge Banal. He ran again for the same position in the 2013 elections but lost.

He is married to Florence Defensor. He is the father of Mike Defensor and Ma. Theresa Defensor, both former congressmen of the same district he represented. Mike represented the district for two terms (1995-1998 and 1998-2001) while Ma. Theresa for one term (2001-2004).

He graduated from University of the Philippines College of Law.

References
 House of Representatives Official Website
 GMA News Online: Defensor Clan

1943 births
Living people
Lakas–CMD (1991) politicians
Lakas–CMD politicians
Members of the House of Representatives of the Philippines from Quezon City
United Nationalist Alliance politicians
People from Quezon City
People from Iloilo